Karissa Kellie Cook (born April 8, 1991) is an American professional beach volleyball player and former indoor volleyball player.

Early life

Cook was born on April 8, 1991, in Salt Lake City, Utah. She came from an athletic family: her father, David, played basketball at the University of San Diego and professionally for the Newcastle Falcons in Australia, and her mother, Suzy, played volleyball for United States International University. Her brother, Brian Cook, also played professional beach volleyball. Cook played volleyball and was also a track athlete for Harbor High School. She was the number 25 recruit nationally in her graduating class. She participated with team USA's junior national team at the 2009 World Championships.

Career

Indoor

Cook played indoor volleyball as a setter for Stanford from 2009 to 2012. She was named to the Pac-10 All-Freshman Team in 2009 and an All-Pac-12 honorable mention selection as a junior in 2011. She finished her career with 142 kills, 3,027 assists and 53 service aces. She briefly returned to Stanford in 2015 as an assistant coach for the beach volleyball team.

Beach

Cook played beach volleyball for Hawaii's beach volleyball team in 2014. She graduated from Hawaii with a masters degree in Civil Engineering. During the season, she was named an All-American. She posted a team-best 42–7 record and finished as the runner-up at the AVCA Pairs National Championship.

Cook made her AVP debut in Manhattan Beach with Michelle Iafigliola in 2015, they placed 25th at the tournament. In 2018, partnered with Katie Spieler, she started off the AVP season with a third place finish. In October 2018, with Spieler, they won the gold medal at the NORCECA beach tour championships in Pointe Du-Martin in Martinique, defeating Canadians Sophie Bukovec and Alexandra Poletto 21–18, 20–22, 15–12.

In 2019, Cook partnered with Jace Pardon, she won her first AVP title Austin, Texas. Cook and Pardon teamed together again to represent the U.S. in the 2019 Pan American Games in Peru, winning the gold medal against two-time Olympian Ana Gallay and Fernanda Pereyra of Argentina. It was the first time that the United States won a gold medal at the Pan American Games in beach volleyball.

In October 2019, Cook won a gold medal with her teammates at the 2019 World Beach Games that were held in Doha, Qatar in the 4x4 beach volleyball event. She had five kills and five blocks in the championship match versus Brazil.

External links
Team USA profile

References

1991 births
Living people
Volleyball players from California
People from Santa Cruz, California
Sportspeople from Salt Lake City
Setters (volleyball)
American women's volleyball players
American women's beach volleyball players
Stanford Cardinal women's volleyball players
Hawaii Rainbow Wahine beach volleyball players
University of Hawaiʻi at Mānoa alumni
Beach volleyball players at the 2019 Pan American Games
Medalists at the 2019 Pan American Games
21st-century American women